Blank-Wave Arcade is the second studio album by the new wave band The Faint. It was released on November 1, 1999.

This album is the 28th release of Saddle Creek Records.

Track listing
 "Sex Is Personal" – 3:37
 "Call Call" – 2:26
 "Worked Up So Sexual" – 2:40
 "Cars Pass in Cold Blood" – 2:40
 "Casual Sex" – 3:15
 "Victim Convenience" – 2:55
 "Sealed Human" – 3:06
 "In Concert" – 2:19
 "The Passives" – 2:41

Personnel 

Clark Baechle – drums
Todd Fink – vocals
A.J. Mogis – engineer
 Joel Petersen – bass, guitar
 Jacob Thiele – synthesizer, vocals
 Jamie Williams – photography, cover photograph

References

1999 albums
The Faint albums
Saddle Creek Records albums